The 8th Military District was an administrative district of the Australian Army. During the Second World War, the 8th Military District covered the Territory of New Guinea, the Solomon Islands and the New Hebrides, with its headquarters firstly at Rabaul and later at Port Moresby.

In 1942, the 8th Military District was converted into New Guinea Force.

References

History of Papua New Guinea
History of Vanuatu
Military districts of Australia
Papua New Guinea in World War II